Mavzuna Chorieva (born 1 October 1992 in Kulob, Tajikistan) is a Tajikistani boxer. She won bronze at the 2012 Summer Olympics in the lightweight event. Mavzuna Chorieva became the first woman to win an Olympic medal for Tajikistan.

References

External links

Living people
Tajikistani women boxers
Boxers at the 2012 Summer Olympics
Olympic boxers of Tajikistan
1992 births
Olympic bronze medalists for Tajikistan
Olympic medalists in boxing
Boxers at the 2010 Asian Games
Boxers at the 2014 Asian Games
Medalists at the 2012 Summer Olympics
AIBA Women's World Boxing Championships medalists
Asian Games competitors for Tajikistan
Lightweight boxers